We Are King (also stylized as We Are KING), is an American R&B duo based in Los Angeles, California, consisting of twin sisters Amber and Paris Strother. Originally named King, the group also included their close friend Anita Bias. The Strother sisters are the nieces of the Minneapolis, Minnesota-based electric bluesman, Percy Strother, and are originally from Minneapolis.

Career
The trio first appeared in 2011, when, on March 1, they independently released their The Story, a three-song EP that captured the attention and garnered support from a number of artists including Phonte of The Foreign Exchange, Questlove, Erykah Badu, and eventually Prince, who invited the two to open for him at his 21-Night Stand Tour at the Los Angeles Forum. Prince subsequently became the girls' mentor and advisor, providing them with managerial support until 2013. King founded their company King Creative in 2013, releasing their teaser single "In the Meantime" the same year, premiered by Billboard, and followed up with their second single, "Mister Chameleon" in 2014. On February 5, 2016, the trio released their debut studio album, We Are King, to critical acclaim. The album was nominated for Best Urban Contemporary Album at the 59th Grammy Awards, making King the first independent band to be nominated in that category. We Are King was also included on mid-year and year-end lists by Rolling Stone, Time, Billboard, NPR, Spin, Newsday and Pitchfork among others.

Discography

Studio albums

EPs
The Story (2011)

Singles
"In the Meantime" (2013)
"Mister Chameleon" (2014)
"The Greatest" (2015)

Covers

 Fela Kuti "Go Slow" (2014)
 David Bowie "Space Oddity" (2021)

Collaborations 

Features 

 Coldplay & We Are KING & Jacob Collier - "Human Heart"
 Nicolas Godin featuring We Are KING - “Another Side"
Robert Glasper featuring We Are KING - “Move Love"
Miles Davis & Robert Glasper featuring We Are KING - "Song For Selim"
 The Foreign Exchange featuring Paris and Amber Strother - “All the Kisses"
 Sam Sparro featuring We Are KING - “Outside the Blue"
 Devin Morrisson featuring We Are KING - "The Call (407)"
 Alex Isley featuring Paris Strother - “So Here it Goes"

Songwriting, Musician, Vocal and Production Credits

 Coldplay - “Coloratura", "Human Heart"
 Leon Bridges - “Motorbike", 'Details", "Steam", "Sho Nuff", "Don't Worry"
 Corrine Bailey Rae - “Green Aphrodisiac", "Tell Me", "Horse Print Dress", "Been to the Moon"
 Moses Sumney - "Quarrel"
 Logic - “Thank You"
 Bilal - “Right at the Core"
 Robert Glasper Experiment - “Move Love"
 Jill Scott - “So Gone"
 Kendrick Lamar - “Chapter 6"
 Nick Hakim - "Qadir"
 Baby Rose - "Show You", "Sold Out", "Pressure"
 Eric Roberson - "Just Imagine"
 Avicii - "Lay Me Down"

Awards and nominations

Notes

References

External links
 

2011 establishments in California
African-American girl groups
American contemporary R&B musical groups
Musical groups established in 2011
Musical groups from Los Angeles
American musical trios
Vocal trios
Musical groups from Minnesota
Musical groups from the Twin Cities